Alboglossiphonia is a genus of Glossiphoniidae.

The genus was described in 1976 by E. I. Lukin.

It has cosmopolitan distribution.

Species:
 Alboglossiphonia australiensis (Goddard, 1908)
 Alboglossiphonia heteroclita (Linnaeus, 1761)
 Alboglossiphonia inflexa (Goddard, 1908)
 Alboglossiphonia intermedia (Goddard, 1909)
 Alboglossiphonia masoni (Mason, 1974)
 Alboglossiphonia multistriata (Mason, 1974)
 Alboglossiphonia tasmaniensis (Ingram, 1957)

References

Leeches